Sirius XM Weather & Emergency was a free satellite radio channel dedicated to providing critical, updated information before, during and after natural disasters, weather emergencies and other hazardous incidents as well as AMBER Alerts to listeners across North America.  The channel was also affiliated with The Weather Channel.  It was normally a low bitrate channel, but bitrate was raised in case of widespread emergencies. The channel number, 247 on XM, is a reference to the term 24/7, the old name of the channel XM Emergency Alert.

As a promotional channel, it was available from any XM or Sirius radio without a subscription (which is required by law as part of the Emergency Alert System, which they are required to take part in).

These channels were discontinued during November 2010.

Past emergencies as XM Emergency Alert 
During these events, XM Emergency Alert was used to give specific regional information for the affected area:

2011 
Hurricane Irene with an audio relay of The Weather Channel from August 28–29.

2010 
None.

2009 
None.

2008 
Hurricane Ike, and local relays of KTRH and KHOU-TV.
Hurricane Hanna
Hurricane Gustav, and local relay of WRNO-FM
Tropical Storm Fay
Hurricane Dolly

2007 
October 2007 California wildfires, and local radio relays of KFI and KOGO
February–March 2007 Tornado Outbreak

2006 

2006 Colorado Blizzard
2006 Kiholo Bay earthquake
Hurricane Florence
Hurricane Ernesto
Tropical Storm Chris
Tropical Storm Alberto

2005 

2005 New York City transit strike
Hurricane Wilma
Hurricane Rita
Hurricane Ophelia
Hurricane Katrina
Hurricane Dennis

2004 
 Hurricane Jeanne
 Hurricane Ivan

External links 
 Sirius XM Weather & Emergency - XM Webpage
 Sirius XM Weather & Emergency - Sirius webapage

XM Satellite Radio channels
Digital-only radio stations
News and talk radio stations in the United States
Sirius Satellite Radio channels
Radio stations established in 2004
Defunct radio stations in the United States